Falke was a German program to fly a subscale model of the Space Shuttle orbiter in real conditions in order to obtain aerodynamic data in the frame of the preparation of the Hermes spaceplane. One flight test was performed in 1990.

Organization
The program was funded by the German federal Ministry of Research. The leadership of the program was DLR. The flight model was produced by the German company OHB-System

Flight model characteristics

 Length 
 Wing span 
 Height 
 Mass 

The shape of Falke was the one of the Space Shuttle orbiter with a 1/5 scale factor. Falke had its own power, an autopilot and a computer to control the hydraulically actuated flight control surfaces of the spaceplane.

The sensor suite of Falke was measuring attitude, temperature, flux, pressure and acceleration.

CNES was tracking Falke by radar and telemetry.

Flight history
The only flight of Falke took place on September 6, 1990. French space agency CNES launched a stratospheric balloon from its Aire-sur-l'Adour center carrying Falke.

At the end of the flight, a parachute was deployed at an altitude of 6 km and Falke landed in horizontal position on airbags.

Outcome
Three further flights were foreseen, but they were cancelled when the European Space Agency cancelled Hermes.

References
Details and images of the balloon drop test from a balloon in 1990 - StratoCat website
 French Balloon Operational Activity - Overall view and two examples: FALKE, an aeronautic project using Stratospheric balloon, and Arctic long-duration flights during the ILAS campaign - Pierre Faucon - CNES, Aire-sur-l'Adour - Paper ISTS 98 - j - 19V

Spaceplanes